You Might Be Smiling Now... is the third studio album by Scottish indie pop group The Just Joans. It was released on 1 December 2017 by Fika Recordings. Their first full-length album in five years and first release in four, You Might Be Smiling Now... has been described as "a loose concept album [which details] the confusion of singer-songwriter David Pope’s teenage years, the horror of his twenties and the terror of his encroaching middle age".

Track listing

References

2017 albums